Karachi Se Lahore is a 2015 Pakistani road-comedy adventure film directed and produced by Wajahat Rauf under production banner Showcase Productions. The film's story is written by Yasir Hussain Karachi Se Lahore features an ensemble cast, including Javed Sheikh, Mantaha Tareen Maqsood, Yasir Hussain, Ahmed Ali Akbar, Eshita Syed, Aashir Wajahat and Rasheed Naz, whereas lead roles are played by Shehzad Sheikh and Ayesha Omer. This is the first Pakistani road-trip film which covers the 36 hours journey from Karachi to Lahore in real time, where the characters face obstacles, overcome them and undergo personal growth.

The film was released by IMGC Global Entertainment in cinemas nationwide on 31 July 2015. It is first Pakistani film to be premiered in Hollywood.

The film was followed by a spin-off titled Lahore Se Aagey, which was released in 2016.

Plot 

The story follows Zaheem, the protagonist, who gets run over by everyone he loves. After his girlfriend notifies Zaheem that she's going to visit Lahore, he decides to let himself go to a party that his friends, Sam and Moti insisted he go to. While in the party, he finds out that his girlfriend is marrying her cousin in Lahore. Frantic and upset, he tries to go to Lahore via Karachi Jinnah International airport, but finds out on the news that the Pakistan Authority of Civil Aviation has banned all flights from Karachi International due to workers on strike. He begs his neighbors (Mariyam and Zeezo), to use their Jeep but they decline at first. When they reluctantly allow (although Maryiam's father cherishes the Jeep and lets no one use it) they start. They stop at a hotel for the night, but the receptionist asks for a marriage certificate and unneeded stuff. But a Sindhi Landlord and his goons come and scold the receptionist for letting his daughter sleep with a random man, and forces the receptionist to give Zaheem a room. After proposing to Maryiam with a Cornetto, the team decide to eat breakfast while Moti goes to the toilet. He meets a Pashtun man where he accidentally punches and runs off after the man scared him. They drive away and Moti says he knows a short cut. The map was wrong, but Zaheem doesn't know. After Zaheem wakes up, he finds out that they aren't in Lahore and punches Moti. Moti gets upset and Mariyam scolds Zaheem. After everything is solved, they drive again and Zeezo demands to drive the car or else he would snitch. Zeezo crashes the car, so the team make a car pull over and help them. In that car was none other than the Pashtun man. In exchange for listening for fixing their car, Zaheem must listen to his story. But the Pashtun man demands another favor and asks to take Sam for a day. After getting back Sam, they drive to Lahore where they get into the wedding. Maryiam sees her dad at the wedding, having a drink with a woman named Khushi, while drinking alcohol. (Maryiams mom had died and in Muslim culture alcohol is prohibited). Zaheem confesses his love for his girlfriend, and preaches his love for her, until stopping mid-way and finding out that he really loves Maryiam. The movie ends with Zaheem proposing to Maryiam and her accepting, but Maryiams father catches them.

Cast 
 Shehzad Sheikh as Zaheem
 Ayesha Omer as Maryam
 Ahmed Ali Akbar as Sam
 Aashir Wajahat as Zeezo
 Yasir Hussain as Mutazalzal a.k.a. Moti
 Jawed Sheikh as Tiwana
 Eshita Syed as Ayesha (Aashi)
 Mantaha Tareen Maqsood as Khushi
 Rasheed Naz as Khan Sahib
 Muzna Ibrahim as a lady in the bank (special appearance)
 Wajahat Rauf as Sindhi Landlord (special appearance)
 Hashim Butt as Malik Sahib (Drunk Man)
 Noor ul Hassan as policeman
 Sumbul Ansari as Zaheem's mother (Special appearance)

Production

Marketing 
First poster of film was revealed on 13 January 2015. The first look teaser of an item song featuring Ayesha Omer released on 21 March. First look teaser trailer along with poster was revealed in a press conference held in Karachi. Theatrical poster featuring film sponsors with release date was revealed on 30 April 2015. Character poster featuring Yasir Hussain was revealed on 30 June. More character posters were also revealed later in same month. On 17 July a video song titled Aja Re Aja was released on Vimeo.
Digital marketing and PR for the film is being handled by SocialSell, the official digital partners for the film. The soundtrack of this movie was also released in India under the label of Sony Music (India).

Release
Karachi se Lahore was released nationwide in over 60 screens on 31 July 2015. The film was premiered in Hollywood, Los Angeles on 16 August. The world television premiere of film was shown on Urdu 1 on 25 September 2015 (Eid 1st Day). It was set to be released in the USA on 27 November 2015.

Critical reception
Rafay Mahmood of The Express Tribune rated the film 2.5 out of 5 stars and given the verdict as "Karachi Se Lahore has hilarious moments that at times seem out of place. Watch the film to learn some new jokes, but opt out if you are looking for a good big screen experience."

Spin-off

In November 2015, director Wajahat Rauf announced that there will be a spin-off film of Karachi Se Lahore, scheduled to be released in 2016. He said: "This will be more of a romantic-comedy and will follow the adventures of a young couple. It is set right after the events of Karachi Se Lahore."

The film was titled Lahore Se Aagey, and starred Saba Qamar and Yasir Hussain in starring roles alongside Rubina Ashraf, Behroze Sabzwari and Atiqa Odho. It was released on 11 November 2016 to poor critical response.

Accolades

See also 
 List of directorial debuts
 List of Pakistani films of 2015
 List of highest grossing Pakistani films
 Karachi Lahore (film series)

References 
 http://tribune.com.pk/story/1151857/live-updates-heres-whats-happening-lsa-2016/

 Karachi news online

External links 
 
 

Films shot in Karachi
Films shot in Lahore
2010s Urdu-language films
2010s road movies
2010s adventure comedy films
2015 films
Films set in Sindh
Films set in Punjab, Pakistan
Pakistani adventure comedy films
Films directed by Wajahat Rauf
Yasir Hussain
Films shot in Gilgit-Baltistan
2015 directorial debut films
2015 comedy films
Pakistani road comedy-drama films
Urdu-language Pakistani films